Faldbakken is a Norwegian surname. Notable people with the surname include:

Knut Faldbakken (born 1941), Norwegian novelist
Matias Faldbakken (born 1973), Norwegian artist and writer
Stefan Faldbakken (born 1972), Norwegian film director and screenwriter

Norwegian-language surnames